The women's tournament was one of two handball tournaments at the 1976 Summer Olympics. It was the first appearance of a women's handball tournament at the Olympic Games.

Qualification

Results

Top goalscorers

Team rosters

References

Women's tournament
Olymp
Women's events at the 1976 Summer Olympics